Vallentuna BK is a Swedish football club located in Vallentuna.

Background
Since their foundation in 1919 Vallentuna Bollklubb has participated mainly in the lower divisions of the Swedish football league system. The club currently plays in Division 3 Norra Svealand which is the fifth tier of Swedish football. They play their home matches at the Vallentuna IP in Vallentuna.

The club is affiliated to the Stockholms Fotbollförbund.

Season to season

External links
 [ Vallentuna BK] – Official Website

Footnotes

Football clubs in Stockholm
Association football clubs established in 1919
1919 establishments in Sweden